Boreotrophon is a genus of sea snails, marine gastropod mollusks in the subfamily Pagodulinae of the family Muricidae, the murex snails or rock snails.

Species
Species within the genus Boreotrophon include:

 Boreotrophon alaskanus Dall, 1902
 Boreotrophon alborostratus Is. Taki, 1938
 Boreotrophon albus Egorov, 1992
 Boreotrophon aleuticus Houart, Vermeij & Wiedrick, 2019
 Boreotrophon aomoriensis (Nomura & Hatai, 1940)
 Boreotrophon apolyonis (Dall, 1919)
 Boreotrophon avalonensis Dall, 1902
 Boreotrophon bentleyi Dall, 1908
 Boreotrophon candelabrum (Reeve, 1848)
 Boreotrophon cascadiensis Houart, Vermeij & Wiedrick, 2019
 Boreotrophon cepula (Sowerby II, 1880)
 Boreotrophon clathratus (Linnaeus, 1767)
 Boreotrophon clavatus (Sars, 1878)
 Boreotrophon cordellensis Houart, Vermeij & Wiedrick, 2019
 Boreotrophon cortesianus Houart, Vermeij & Wiedrick, 2019
 Boreotrophon cymatus Dall, 1902
 Boreotrophon dabneyi (Dautzenberg, 1889)
 Boreotrophon disparilis (Dall, 1891)
 Boreotrophon egorovi Houart, 1995
 Boreotrophon eucymatus (Dall, 1902)
 Boreotrophon flos Okutani, 1964
 Boreotrophon gaidenkoi Houart, 1995
 Boreotrophon hazardi McLean, 1996
 Boreotrophon houarti Egorov, 1994
 Boreotrophon kabati McLean, 1996
 Boreotrophon kamchatkanus Dall, 1902
 Boreotrophon keepi (A. M. Strong & Hertlein, 1937)
 Boreotrophon macouni Dall & Bartsch, 1910
 Boreotrophon mazatlanicus Dall, 1902
 Boreotrophon multicostatus (Eschscholtz, 1829)
 Boreotrophon obesus Houart, Vermeij & Wiedrick, 2019
 Boreotrophon okhotensis Egorov, 1993
 Boreotrophon pacificus Dall, 1902
 Boreotrophon pedroanus (Arnold, 1903)
 Boreotrophon pseudotripherus Houart, Vermeij & Wiedrick, 2019
 Boreotrophon pygmaeus Egorov, 1994
 Boreotrophon rotundatus Dall, 1902
 Boreotrophon santarosensis Houart, Vermeij & Wiedrick, 2019
 Boreotrophon subapolyonis Houart, Vermeij & Wiedrick, 2019
 Boreotrophon tannerensis Houart, Vermeij & Wiedrick, 2019
 Boreotrophon tolomius (Dall, 1919)
 Boreotrophon triangulatus (Carpenter, 1864)
 Boreotrophon tripherus Dall, 1902
 Boreotrophon trophonis Egorov, 1993
 Boreotrophon truncatus (Ström, 1768)
 Boreotrophon vancouverensis Houart, Vermeij & Wiedrick, 2019
 Boreotrophon xestra Dall, 1918

Species brought into synonymy 
 Boreotrophon abyssorum (A. E. Verrill, 1885): synonym of Pagodula abyssorum (Verrill, 1885)
 Boreotrophon alborostratus Taki, 1938: synonym of Boreotrophon alaskanus Dall, 1902
 Boreotrophon albospinosus Willett, 1931: synonym of Boreotrophon triangulatus (Carpenter, 1864)
 Boreotrophon beringi Dall, 1902: synonym of Boreotrophon cepula (Sowerby, 1880)
 Boreotrophon calliceratus (Dall, 1919): synonym of Boreotrophon avalonensis Dall, 1902
 Boreotrophon cepulus [sic]: synonym of Boreotrophon cepula (Sowerby, 1880)
 Boreotrophon craticulatus (O. Fabricus, 1780): synonym of Scabrotrophon fabricii (Møller, 1842) 
 Boreotrophon dalli (Kobelt, 1878): synonym of Nodulotrophon coronatus (H. Adams & A. Adams, 1864)
 Boreotrophon echinus Dall, 1918: synonym of Nipponotrophon echinus (Dall, 1918)
 Boreotrophon elegantulus (Dall, 1907): synonym of Warenia elegantula (Dall, 1907) (original combination)
 Boreotrophon fabricii (Møller, 1842): synonym of Scabrotrophon fabricii (Møller, 1842)
 Boreotrophon golikovi Egorov, 1992: synonym of Pagodula golikovi (Egorov, 1992)
 Boreotrophon gorgon Dall, 1913: synonym of Nipponotrophon gorgon (Dall, 1913)
 Boreotrophon hadalis Sysoev, 1992: synonym of Abyssotrophon hadalis (Sysoev, 1992)
 Boreotrophon ithitomus (Dall, 1919): synonym of Boreotrophon alaskanus Dall, 1902
 Boreotrophon kamchatkanus Dall, 1902: synonym of Scabrotrophon kamchatkanus (Dall, 1902)
 Boreotrophon keepi (Strong & Hertlein, 1937): synonym of Boreotrophon pedroanus (Arnold, 1903)
 Boreotrophon maclaini Dall, 1902: synonym of Oenopota maclaini (Dall, 1902)
 Boreotrophon pagodus Hayashi & Habe, 1965: synonym of Nipponotrophon pagodus (Hayashi & Habe, 1965)
 Boreotrophon pagodus Egorov, 1993: synonym of Boreotrophon houarti Egorov, 1994
 Boreotrophon panamensis Dall, 1902: synonym of Abyssotrophon panamensis (Dall, 1902)
 Boreotrophon paucicostatus Habe & Ito, 1965: synonym of Boreotrophon candelabrum (Reeve, 1848)
 Boreotrophon peregrinus Dall, 1902: synonym of Boreotrophon multicostatus (Eschscholtz, 1829)
 Boreotrophon shirleyi Cernohorsky, 1980: synonym of Metzgeria shirleyi (Cernohorsky, 1980)
 Boreotrophon smithi Dall, 1902: synonym of Nipponotrophon stuarti (E. A. Smith, 1880)
 Boreotrophon staphylinus (Dall, 1919): synonym of Boreotrophon bentleyi Dall, 1908
 Boreotrophon stephanos Taki, 1938: synonym of Boreotrophon candelabrum (Reeve, 1848)
 Boreotrophon stuarti (E.A. Smith, 1880): synonym of Nipponotrophon stuarti (E. A. Smith, 1880)

References
 Vaught, K.C. (1989). A classification of the living Mollusca. American Malacologists: Melbourne, FL (USA). . XII, 195 pp

 
Pagodulinae
Gastropod genera